Felisberto de Deus (born 6 July 1999) is an athlete from Timor Leste.

He was selected to compete in the men's 1500 metres at the 2020 Summer Games and was given the honour of being the flag bearer for his nation in the opening ceremony.

References

External links
 
 

Living people
1999 births
East Timorese male middle-distance runners
Olympic athletes of East Timor
Athletes (track and field) at the 2020 Summer Olympics
Asian Games competitors for East Timor
Athletes (track and field) at the 2018 Asian Games
People from Ermera District
Competitors at the 2021 Southeast Asian Games
Southeast Asian Games silver medalists for East Timor
Southeast Asian Games medalists in athletics